The Crystal Peak Dolomite is a geologic formation in the Wah Wah Mountains of western Utah. It preserves fossils dating to the Middle Ordovician period.

Background 
This geographic stratum is named for its dolomite (used to describe a sedimentary carbonate rock composed predominantly of the mineral dolomite). It separates the Watson Ranch Quartzite tongue of Swan Peak Quartzite from the younger Eureka Quartzite. The stratum generally consists of brown, gray to black, usually fine- to medium-grained, but may be coarse-grained, dolomite. The stratum is fossiliferous and it has been shown to contain orthocone cephalopods and corals identified as Eofletcheria sp.. It is classified as Middle Ordovician age. The Crystal Peak equivalent has been recognized in the Lehman Formation in the Snake Range of Nevada, but was not specifically identified in adjoining eastern Nevada.

See also 
 List of fossiliferous stratigraphic units in Utah
 Paleontology in Utah

References

Bibliography 
 L.F. Hintze. 1951. Lower Ordovician detailed stratigraphic sections for western Utah. Utah Geological and Mineralogical Survey Bulletin 39:99

External links 
 
 

Ordovician geology of Utah
Ordovician System of North America
Ordovician southern paleotropical deposits
Dolomite formations
Limestone formations
Shallow marine deposits
Paleontology in Utah